Girl House is a 2014 Canadian horror slasher film directed by Trevor Matthews and written by Nick Gordon.  It stars Ali Cobrin playing a woman in an X-rated reality web series and Slaine as the psychopath who stalks her.

Plot 

In Rehobeth, Alabama, 1988, two little girls trick an overweight child they have nicknamed "Loverboy" into dropping his pants and preparing for a kiss, only to tease and humiliate him. When one of the girls rides home alone afterwards, Loverboy knocks her from her bicycle and throws her off a bridge, making the girl's death look like an accident.

In the present day, struggling to pay her way through school following the death of her father, college coed Kylie Atkins is recruited by entrepreneur Gary Preston to join his online pornography venture Girl House. Girl House allows its users to watch the ladies living inside the house 24/7 via 50 camera feeds. The girls perform stripteases and regular daily activities with the option of performing sexual acts on camera for additional money. Gary assures Kylie that Girl House's technology cannot be hacked and that the house's secret location is untraceable. He brings Kylie to the house and introduces her to Steve, who shares security guard duties with Big Mike. Kylie also meets fellow Girl House residents Kat, Devon, Janet, Heather, and Mia.

Kylie performs her first striptease online and captures the attention of Loverboy, who watches from his basement in Atlanta and is known as a Girl House regular. Also watching are Alex and his college roommate Ben Stanley, who recognizes Kylie as the girl he has had a crush on since kindergarten. Having been banned for her heroin addiction, former Girl House performer Anna sneaks back into the house and convinces Gary to give her another try. Ben and Kylie begin a relationship. Kylie has a private chat session with Loverboy. He hacks into the computer system and surprises Kylie by sending her a picture of his face. Anna later finds the picture while snooping on Kylie's laptop. Later, Ben admits to Kylie that he knows about her involvement with Girl House. However, they talk through the issue and continue their relationship.

Loverboy angers the other women in Girl House by continually asking for Kylie when she is not there. The girls begin making fun of him for being pathetic. Loverboy notices his picture on the bulletin board inside Girl House with a handwritten caption that reads, "What a stud." Kylie comes home and takes down the picture as soon as she sees it. Eventually, Loverboy snaps. He hacks into Girl House's system, dons a mask, and breaks into the building housing Girl House's servers, where he kills the website's technical team. Loverboy straps Gary to a chair and stabs him several times. Slowly dying from blood loss, Gary is forced to watch through the monitors as Loverboy travels to the house's location and continues his rampage. Loverboy kills Steve at the security gatehouse. He then strangles Anna with a piece of rope inside the house's off-camera room.

From his dorm room, Alex watches as Loverboy mutilates Devon during a private dance. Alex shows Ben the carnage taking place live at Girl House. Ben tries texting a warning to Kylie but, just as she returns to Girl House, Loverboy jams incoming and outgoing communications. Oblivious to what is going on inside the house, Kylie retires to her room. Ben instructs Alex to try hacking into Girl House to find its address while he goes in search of other ways to locate Kylie. Meanwhile, Loverboy kills Heather and her boyfriend while they are having sex. Janet investigates the commotion and catches Loverboy in the act of severing the boyfriend's head; Loverboy throws her over an upstairs railing. She survives, but breaks her legs in the fall. Next, Loverboy locks Mia in the sauna room. She smashes a lump of coal through the door and escapes to the pool outside, but there Loverboy kills her with a sledgehammer. Gary eventually dies from blood loss while watching the horror unfold onscreen at the technical facility. Kylie realizes the danger when she spots Loverboy at the pool from her window. Loverboy electronically locks Kylie inside the house. Janet attacks him, but is unsuccessful and gets stabbed in the head.

Kylie finds Kat and tries to hide in her bedroom. Loverboy breaks in and corners Kylie, who now recognizes him. Kat seemingly knocks Loverboy unconscious with his crowbar and goes for help while Kylie tries to find Devon. Kat meets Big Mike at the front door, but Loverboy recovers in time to kill them both. Kylie is able to find Devon and tells her to stay in her bedroom while she searches for help. Distraught over her disfigured face and severed fingers, Devon suffocates herself with a plastic bag. At the same time, Ben finds Kylie's friend Liz Owens at Selby College and together they try to find out where Kylie is. Ben helps the police find an address for Girl House, but their tactical team ends up storming the technical facility instead. Alex eventually hacks into Girl House's ISP and determines the house's real address. Ben races there with Liz.

Loverboy chases Kylie throughout the house. She hides in the utility room and shuts off all of the cameras. She then lures Loverboy to a darkened basement where she uses a video camera's night vision to help her stab him in the stomach with a pool stick. Injured, Loverboy overpowers and begins to strangle her, but she ends up clubbing him to death with the camera. She runs outside, where Ben and Liz show up with the police and a news crew following behind. The film ends with Kylie breathing deeply and the screen cuts to black.

Cast 
 Ali Cobrin as Kylie Atkins
 Adam DiMarco as Ben Stanley 
 Slaine as LoverBoy
 James Thomas as Gary Preston
 Chasty Ballesteros as Janet
 Alice Hunter as Kat
 Alyson Bath as Devon
 Elysia Rotaru as Heather
 Nicole Fox as Mia
 Zuleyka Silver as Anna
 Erin Agostino as Liz 
 Wesley MacInnes as Alex
 Camren Bicondova as The Queen
 Isaac Faulkner as Young LoverBoy

Production 
Director-producer Matthews came up with the idea while attempting to find a distributor for The Shrine.  After realizing that he had not seen themes of pornography and privacy explored in a slasher film, he recruited Gordon to write the script.  The story was always important to Mathews, and he said that he was very enthused with the project when he read Gordon's script.  Though it was his first film, Matthews said that his experiences with previous productions had been collaborative enough that it seemed like a natural step for him.  Jon Knautz initially co-directed the film, but Knautz got an offer to direct another project.  Matthews encouraged him to take the opportunity and finished directing the film himself.  Matthews was influenced by Halloween and used that film's structure as a guide.  He said that the film serves as a cautionary tale about over-sharing on social media.  Slaine said that the mask he wore was very uncomfortable, and it could only be put on or taken off with help.  As a result, the mask had to stay on for extended periods during shooting.  Slaine attempted to channel events from his own life into his performance to heighten the emotional impact and make his character more sympathetic.  Cobrin said that she experienced some trepidation about her role, but her fondness for slasher films made it easier.  Shooting took place in Kanata, Ontario.

Release 
Girl House played at the Ottawa International Film Festival on October 16, 2014.  Lakeshore Records released the soundtrack by tomandandy on February 10, 2015, and Entertainment One released the film to video on demand on February 13, 2015.

Reception 
Rotten Tomatoes, a review aggregator, reports that 73% of 11 surveyed critics gave the film a positive review; the average rating is 5.58/10.  Frank Scheck of The Hollywood Reporter wrote, "Director Trevor Matthews stages the violent mayhem with admirable profiency, and the film's target audience is bound to come away reasonably satisfied, if not fully satiated."  Maitland McDonagh of Film Journal International described it as a "formulaic but slickly executed thriller that should entertain undemanding genre buffs".  Michael Gingold of Fangoria rated it 2/4 stars and wrote of the film's satiric content, "Too often, though, the moviemakers fall back on grisly, gamy sensationalism."  Pat Torfe of Bloody Disgusting rated it 3.5/5 stars and wrote, "Boasting some strong acting from almost everyone involved, coupled with a scary antagonist and some genuinely brutal moments that gorehounds will love, Girl House is definitely one of the stronger slasher films I've recently seen."  Scott Hallam of Dread Central rated it 3.5/5 stars and wrote, "For a directorial debut, Trevor Matthews does a fantastic job. The movie is slick looking, nicely paced, and keeps the audience's attention at all times."  Matt Donato of We Got This Covered rated it 3/5 stars and wrote, "Girlhouse is just another nudie horror flick at first glance, but a strong finale finishes things off with a bloody, satisfying moneyshot."  Brian Formo of IGN rated it 7/10 stars and wrote, "It's an imperfect debut, but it shows promise."

References

External links 
 
 
 

2014 films
2014 horror films
2014 independent films
2010s slasher films
Canadian independent films
Canadian slasher films
English-language Canadian films
Erotic horror films
Erotic slasher films
Films about mass murder
Films about pornography
Films set in Alabama
Films shot in Ontario
Films scored by Tomandandy
2014 directorial debut films
2010s English-language films
2010s Canadian films